Hugh Glass (1817–1871) was an Australian pastoralist, landowner and land speculator, one of the wealthiest and most influential men in Victoria in the 1850s and 1860s. His wealth was built on pastoral holdings and land deals and he exercised enormous influence over the colony's parliament.

Biography 
Glass was born in Portaferry, County Down, to Thomas Glass, a merchant, and his wife Rachel Pollock.

In 1840, Glass migrated to Victoria and by 1845 he was established as a station agent and merchant. Glass speculated in buying and selling rural landholdings.

In 1853 he married Lucinda Nash, whose father was a Victorian squatter and former captain from the military. Together they had ten children.

Between 1854-1856 he built Flemington House in Melbourne, which his main residence until his death there in 1871.

In 1862 he was considered the richest man in Victoria, but his business empire collapsed in the late 1860s, partly due to droughts.

In 1869, Glass was found guilty of corrupt activities, such as using dummies, and was sentenced to jail. He was saved, however, by Sir William Foster Stawell, the Chief justice of the Supreme Court of Victoria, who argued that the Legislative assembly did not have the right to do so. Glass was thus set free; this result was received well by the public, but was the cause of "grave consternation in parliament".  

After the deterioration of his health due to cancer of the liver, Glass died on 15 May 1871 at age 55, in Flemington, Victoria, from an overdose of chloral hydrate. He was survived by his wife and eight of his children, and was buried at the Melbourne General Cemetery.

Legacy 
Glass Creek, a minor tributary of the Yarra River that flows through the inner-eastern suburbs of Melbourne, is named after him.

Notes

References

Further reading
 

Australian pastoralists
1817 births
1871 deaths
19th-century Australian businesspeople
Australian landowners
19th-century landowners